Eugene E. "Gene" Stipe (October 21, 1926 – July 21, 2012) was an American politician from Oklahoma. He was a member of the Democratic Party.

Early life and career
Gene Stipe was born in Blanco, Oklahoma, the son of Jacob Irvin Stipe, a farmer and coal miner, and Eva Lou Stipe. Following a stint in the United States Navy in the mid-1940s, he was elected to the Oklahoma House of Representatives at the age of 21 in 1948, and served as Assistant Floor Leader from 1949 to 1953. He graduated from law school at the University of Oklahoma while serving in the state House of Representatives, and living at the fire station in Norman, Oklahoma.

Personal life
Stipe married Agnes L. Minter on February 3, 1949, and had one daughter and three grandchildren. They were married until her death on September 29, 2002, at the age of 82. Following Agnes Stipe's death, he married Mary Bea Thetford in December 2003.

State Senate election
Stipe did not seek re-election to the State House in 1954, but was an unsuccessful candidate for a State Senate seat representing McAlester, Oklahoma. 
Two years later, he was elected to the State Senate in a special election, serving from 1957 until his resignation in 2003, becoming the longest-serving member of that body.

Earlier legal problems and 1978 U.S. Senate candidacy
In 1968, Stipe was indicted on charges of federal income tax evasion for allegedly failing to pay taxes on $110,000 in income, but was later acquitted of the charges.

In 1975, he was paid $100,000 plus expenses to assist William Con Sutherland in a bankruptcy case involving Sutherland's vending machine empire. Stipe was accused by bankruptcy trustees of taking his retainer fee from illegally diverted funds. In an out-of-court settlement, Stipe repaid $60,000 in order to resolve the dispute.

Stipe was a candidate for the U.S. Senate seat which was being vacated by Republican Dewey F. Bartlett in the 1978 election. He finished far behind popular Governor David L. Boren and former U.S. Congressman Ed Edmondson, a late entry in the race who finished a distant second in the primary and lost the runoff to Boren.

The following year, Stipe was indicted by a federal grand jury for his role in securing a fraudulent Small Business Administration loan for McAlester Frozen Foods, a food processing company based in Stipe's district. He was acquitted on those charges in 1981. While awaiting trial in the SBA loan case, he was indicted by another federal grand jury on charges of fraud, extortion, and conspiracy relating to his intervention in an extradition case involving a Colorado man.

Resignation and 2003 guilty plea
Stipe resigned from the Oklahoma State Senate in March 2003, was succeeded in the State Senate by Richard Lerblance. A month later, he pleaded guilty to federal charges of perjury, conspiracy to obstruct a Federal Election Commission investigation, and conspiracy to violate the Federal Election Campaign Act, relating to his alleged role in funneling illegal contributions to the failed 1998 congressional campaign of Walt Roberts in Oklahoma's 3rd Congressional District.

In January, 2004, he was sentenced to five years' probation, six months' home detention, 1,000 hours of community service, and fined $735,567. Furthermore, he also agreed to forfeit both his license to practice law and his legislative pension following his guilty plea.

Possible probation revocation and 2007 indictment
In September 2007, federal authorities filed a petition seeking to have Stipe's probation revoked as a result of his alleged ongoing relationship with his former business partner Steve Covington due to the latter's status as a convicted felon. On September 28, a federal judge ordered Stipe, who suffered from hydrocephalus, diabetes and prostate cancer, to undergo a mental competency evaluation at the United States Medical Center for Federal Prisoners in Springfield, Missouri, following a parole revocation hearing in which Stipe required prompting from his attorneys to answer questions, and according to the judge, appeared to be drugged or hypnotized. The request was subsequently denied in November, 2008, following the court's decision that Stipe was incompetent to face a probation revocation hearing and had effectively served the prison sentence he would have been given during his court-ordered mental competency evaluation.

While awaiting a determination on his competency to face probation revocation, Stipe and his brother, Francis, were indicted by a federal grand jury in another case on charges of mail fraud, witness tampering, money laundering and conspiracy, relating to their alleged role in a real estate deal involving a pet food company owned by another one of Gene Stipe's former business partners, Steve Phipps. The witness tampering charge stems from allegations that the Stipe brothers engaged in a conspiracy to influence the testimony of former Oklahoma State Representative Mike Mass by buying the mortgage on a home owned by Mass. The indictment against Stipe was put on hold due to mental competency issues raised during a probation revocation hearing relating to a previous case against him, and Francis Stipe subsequently died following his guilty plea in the indictment.

Death
Stipe died on July 21, 2012, following a lengthy illness at the age of 85 two weeks after the death of his younger brother Clyde Stipe.

References

 Continuing Coverage of Gene Stipe (NewsOK.com)
 Oklahoma Senate Press Release Re: Death of Agnes Stipe
 2004 Justice Department Press Release RE: Stipe Sentencing
 "Stipe enters prison for evaluation" (Tulsa World article) 
 "Former State Senator Indicted (KOTV.com news report) 
 "Clyde Stipe-July 9, 2012 Obituaries-McAlester News-Capital"

External links

1926 births
2012 deaths
People from McAlester, Oklahoma
Military personnel from Oklahoma
University of Oklahoma College of Law alumni
Democratic Party members of the Oklahoma House of Representatives
Democratic Party Oklahoma state senators
Oklahoma lawyers
Disbarred American lawyers
American perjurers
People with hydrocephalus
Oklahoma politicians convicted of crimes
20th-century American politicians
21st-century American politicians
20th-century American lawyers
21st-century American lawyers